Not to be confused with the Roman emperor Trajan

Trahan may refer to:

People
Arthur Trahan, French-Canadian judge
Barry Trahan, American politician
Blake Trahan, American baseball player
Clifford Joseph Trahan, better known as controversial musician Johnny Rebel
Cody Trahan, American softball player
David Trahan, American politician
Don Trahan, American golf instructor and father of D.J. Trahan
D. J. Trahan, American professional golfer
Jennifer Trahan, American academic
Lori Trahan, American politician
Michaël Trahan, French-Canadian poet
Patrick Trahan, American football player
Stryker Trahan, American baseball player
Voorhies Trahan, American crawfish farmer

Products
Trahan, a brand of handmade premium cigar manufactured at the El Rey de los Habanos factory in Miami, Florida

Surnames of French origin
Surnames of Breton origin